Mecynorhina polyphemus  is a large scarab beetle of the subfamily Cetoniinae found in dense tropical African forests, sometimes called the Polyphemus beetle. It is a frequent feeder on fruits and sap flows from tree wounds.

The larvae develop in decomposing log compost.  The third instar constructs an ovoid cocoon for metamorphosis and attaches it to a solid surface.  In captivity, the instar may attach the cocoon to a glass container wall allowing the  opportunity to view the transformation.

Male and female are dimorphic. The female has a shiny surface texture, reflective prismatic coloration, and no horns. The male has horns and flat, velvety coloration. Females are typically 35–55 mm, while males range from 35 to 80 mm.

Subspecies
 Mecynorrhina polyphemus polyphemus Fabricius, 1781 (Ivory Coast, Ghana; Size: ♂ 44–72 mm; ♀ 41–50 mm)
 Mecynorrhina polyphemus confluens Kraatz, 1890 (Democratic Republic of the Congo, Republic of the Congo, Ivory Coast, Gabon and Uganda; Size: ♂ 42–80 mm; ♀ 42–55 mm)

References

External links
 Photos of Mecynorhina (Chelorrhina) polyphemus

Cetoniinae
Beetles described in 1781
Beetles of Africa